West Wicklow, a division of County Wicklow, was a parliamentary constituency  in Ireland, represented in the Parliament of the United Kingdom. From 1885 to 1922 it returned one Member of Parliament (MP) to the House of Commons of the United Kingdom of Great Britain and Ireland.

Until the 1885 general election the area was part of the Wicklow constituency. From 1922, on the establishment of the Irish Free State, it was not represented in the UK Parliament.

Boundaries
This constituency comprised the western part of County Wicklow.

1885–1922: The baronies of Ballinacor South, Shillelagh, Talbotstown Lower and Talbotstown higher, and that part of the barony of Ballinacor North not contained within the constituency of East Wicklow.

United Kingdom Parliament or Dáil Éireann 1918–1922
The general election of 1918 (in Ireland) was, in British law, to fill the 105 Irish seats in the UK House of Commons for the 31st United Kingdom Parliament. In practice, only the non-Sinn Féin MPs took their seats at Westminster. This Parliament first met on 4 February 1919, and was dissolved on 26 October 1922. At its dissolution, the Parliamentary seats in the twenty six counties comprising the Irish Free State were abolished.

Irish Republicans regard the 1918 election as being to the 1st Dáil Éireann. In practice, only the Sinn Féin Members of Parliament became Teachtaí Dála in the new revolutionary assembly. See list of members of the 1st Dáil. The initial meeting of the First Dáil was on 21 January 1919 and it last met on 10 May 1921.

From the 1922 United Kingdom general election, only the six counties of Northern Ireland were represented in Parliament.

For links to all other constituencies see List of UK Parliament Constituencies in Ireland and Northern Ireland.

Members of Parliament

Elections

Elections in the 1880s

Elections in the 1890s

Elections in the 1900s

Elections in the 1910s

O'Connor dies, causing a by-election.

O'Kelly's death causes a by-election.

References

Historic constituencies in County Wicklow
Westminster constituencies in County Wicklow (historic)
Dáil constituencies in the Republic of Ireland (historic)
Constituencies of the Parliament of the United Kingdom established in 1885
Constituencies of the Parliament of the United Kingdom disestablished in 1922
1885 establishments in Ireland
1922 disestablishments in Ireland